Adrien Bongiovanni (born 20 September 1999) is a Belgian footballer who plays as a midfielder.

Club career

Monaco
Bongiovanni made his professional debut on 26 April 2017 in the Coupe de France semi-final against Paris Saint-Germain replacing Valère Germain in the 60th minute of a 5–0 away loss.

International career
Bongiovanni was born in Belgium and is of Italian descent. He is a youth international for Belgium.

Career statistics

Club

References

External links
Belgium FA profile
Monaco profile

1999 births
Living people
People from Seraing
Association football defenders
Belgian footballers
Belgium youth international footballers
Belgian people of Italian descent
Belgian expatriate footballers
AS Monaco FC players
Cercle Brugge K.S.V. players
AS Béziers (2007) players
FC Den Bosch players
Ligue 1 players
Belgian Pro League players
Championnat National players
Championnat National 2 players
Eerste Divisie players
Belgian expatriate sportspeople in Monaco
Belgian expatriate sportspeople in France
Belgian expatriate sportspeople in the Netherlands
Expatriate footballers in Monaco
Expatriate footballers in France
Expatriate footballers in the Netherlands
Footballers from Liège Province